Max & the Magic Marker is a platform game released for WiiWare, PlayStation 3, Nintendo DS, Macintosh, Microsoft Windows, iOS, Windows Phone 7, and Windows Phone 8. It was developed by Press Play.

The protagonist is a boy named Max, who draws a monster with a special magic marker that he happened to come across. The monster comes to life, invades Max's drawings and begins wreaking havoc in them. Max must chase and get rid of the monster, with the help of the magic marker.

Gameplay

Max & the Magic Marker is a platform game with gameplay elements similar to Crayon Physics where the magic marker is controlled by the mouse and is used to create physical objects such as platforms and boxes to assist Max in his adventure. The Magic Marker is used by the player to create bridges, platforms and heavy objects to help Max cross caverns, rise up on moving objects, or be propelled in the air via a seesaw.

Reception 

Upon release Max & the Magic Marker received mixed reviews and now holds a Metacritic score of 76/100 for the original WiiWare version.

Sequel
A sequel, entitled Max: The Curse of Brotherhood, was released for download for Xbox One on December 20, 2013. Xbox 360 and Microsoft Windows versions were also announced, and released on May 21, 2014.

References

External links
Official site

2010 video games
IOS games
MacOS games
Nintendo DS games
WiiWare games
Windows games
Windows Phone games
PlayStation Network games
Video games developed in Denmark
Single-player video games
Microsoft games
Press Play (company) games